Tafsir al-Kabir may refer to:

Tafsir al-Kabir (al-Razi) by Fakhr al-Din al-Razi, commonly known as Mafatih al-Ghayb
Tafsir al-Tabari by Ibn Jarir al-Tabari
Tafseer-e-Kabeer, by Mirza Basheer-ud-Din Mahmood Ahmad
Tafsir al-Thalabi by Ahmad ibn Muhammad al-Thalabi

See also
List of tafsir works
Tafsir (disambiguation)